This is a list of members of the 11th Bundestag – the lower house of parliament of the Federal Republic of Germany, whose members were in office from 1987 until 1990. German reunification took place during this Bundestag.



Summary 
This summary includes changes in the numbers of the five caucuses (CDU/CSU, SPD, Greens, FDP, Party of Democratic Socialism):

Starting with the first West German election in 1949, West Berlin sent a number of deputies (de) to the Bundestag. Under the terms of the Four Power Agreement on Berlin, West Berlin could not participate in West German federal elections, so instead the city's state parliament chose 22 non-voting "Berlin deputies" on the same date as elections were held in the rest of West Germany. These deputies were non-voting for most of West Berlin's history, but on 8 June 1990 they were given full voting right, increasing the voting membership of the Bundestag from 497 to 519. The 22 members elected in 1987 were broken down by party as follows: 11 from the CDU, 7 from the SPD, 2 from the FDP, and 2 from the Alliance 90/Green Party.

German reunification took place during this Bundestag. When East Germany was dissolved on 3 October 1990, 144 members of the Volkskammer were transferred to the Bundestag, who would sit until the next election along with the West German members elected in 1987. This increased the size of the Bundestag to 663. The 144 members were broken down by party as follows: 63 from the CDU, 33 from the SPD, 24 from the PDS, 9 from the BFD, 8 from the DSU, and 7 from Alliance 90/Green Party. See 1990 East German general election#Aftermath for details.

Members

A 

 Manfred Abelein, CDU
 Else Ackermann, CDU (from 3 October 1990)
 Irmgard Adam-Schwaetzer, FDP
 Brigitte Adler, SPD
 Karl Ahrens, SPD
 Michael Albrecht, CDU (from 3 October 1990)
 Andreas Amende, SPD (from 3 October 1990)
 Max Amling, SPD
 Gerd Andres, SPD
 Dieter Annies, FDP (from 3 October 1990)
 Robert Antretter, SPD
 Hans Apel, SPD
 Anneliese Augustin, CDU (from 6 December 1989)
 Dietrich Austermann, CDU

B 

 Hermann Bachmaier, SPD
 Egon Bahr, SPD
 Georg Bamberg, SPD
 Martin Bangemann, FDP (until 5 January 1989)
 Angelika Barbe, SPD (from 3 October 1990)
 Lothar Barthel, CDU (from 3 October 1990)
 Harald Bauer, CDU (from 3 October 1990)
 Wolf Bauer, CDU
 Gerhart Baum, FDP
 Richard Bayha, CDU
 Marieluise Beck-Oberdorf, Die Grünen
 Roland Becker, CDU (from 3 October 1990)
 Karl Becker, CDU
 Helmuth Becker, SPD
 Ingrid Becker-Inglau, SPD
 Klaus Beckmann, FDP
 Angelika Beer, Die Grünen
 Lieselotte Berger, CDU (until 26 September 1989)
 Sabine Bergmann-Pohl, CDU (from 3 October 1990)
 Hans Gottfried Bernrath, SPD
 Kurt Biedenkopf, CDU (until 9 November 1990)
 Alfred Biehle, CSU (until 27 April 1990)
 Rudolf Bindig, SPD
 Marianne Birthler, Bündnis 90 (from 3 October 1990)
 Ingrid Bittner, PDS (from 3 October 1990)
 Joseph-Theodor Blank, CDU
 Heribert Blens, CDU
 Norbert Blüm, CDU
 Lieselott Blunck, SPD
 Frank Bogisch, SPD (from 3 October 1990)
 Friedrich Bohl, CDU
 Wilfried Bohlsen, CDU
 Wilfried Böhm, CDU
 Ulrich Böhme, SPD
 Jürgen Bohn, FDP (from 3 October 1990)
 Jochen Borchert, CDU
 Wolfgang Börnsen, CDU
 Arne Börnsen, SPD
 Wolfgang Bötsch, CSU
 Gerhard Botz, SPD (from 3 October 1990)
 Helga Brahmst-Rock, Die Grünen
 Willy Brandt, SPD
 Hans-Jochim Brauer, Die Grünen
 Günther Bredehorn, FDP
 Paul Breuer, CDU
 Ulrich Briefs, other (independent from 1 October 1990)
 Alwin Brück, SPD
 Monika Brudlewsky, CDU (from 3 October 1990)
 Josef Brunner, CSU (from 5 May 1990)
 Hans Büchler, SPD
 Peter Büchner, SPD
 Klaus Bühler, CDU
 Edelgard Bulmahn, SPD
 Andreas von Bülow, SPD
 Helmut Buschbom, CDU
 Hermann Buschfort, SPD

C 
 Manfred Carstens, CDU
 Peter Harry Carstensen, CDU
 Wolf-Michael Catenhusen, SPD
 Joachim Clemens, CDU
 Margit Conrad, SPD (until 31 May 1990)
 Peter Conradi, SPD
 Klaus-Peter Creter, CDU (from 3 October 1990)
 Dieter-Julius Cronenberg, FDP
 Herbert Czaja, CDU

D 

 Hans Daniels, CDU
 Wolfgang Daniels, Die Grünen
 Klaus Daubertshäuser, SPD
 Herta Däubler-Gmelin, SPD
 Klaus Daweke, CDU
 Wolfgang Dehnel, CDU (from 3 October 1990)
 Gertrud Dempwolf, CDU
 Marlies Deneke, PDS (from 3 October 1990)
 Karl Deres, CDU
 Gerhard Dewitz, CDU (from 20 February 1990)
 Nils Diederich, SPD (from 12 May 1989)
 Karl Diller, SPD
 Marliese Dobberthien, SPD (from 1 July 1987 until 29 August 1988)
 Werner Dollinger, CSU
 Hans-Georg Dorendorf, CDU (from 3 October 1990)
 Ernst Paul Dörfler, Grüne DDR (from 3 October 1990)
 Werner Dörflinger, CDU
 Hansjürgen Doss, CDU
 Heidrun Dräger, SPD (from 3 October 1990)
 Alfred Dregger, CDU
 Rudolf Dreßler, SPD
 Freimut Duve, SPD

E 

 Thomas Ebermann, Die Grünen (until 18 February 1989)
 Jürgen Echternach, CDU
 Jürgen Egert, SPD
 Wolfgang Ehlers, CDU (from 3 October 1990)
 Horst Ehmke, SPD
 Udo Ehrbar, CDU
 Herbert Ehrenberg, SPD
 Tay Eich, Die Grünen (from 20 February 1989)
 Uschi Eid, Die Grünen
 Karl Eigen, CDU
 Norbert Eimer, FDP
 Konrad Elmer, SPD (from 3 October 1990)
 Alfred Emmerlich, SPD
 Hans A. Engelhard, FDP
 Matthias Engelsberger, CSU
 Dagmar Enkelmann, PDS (from 3 October 1990)
 Gernot Erler, SPD
 Helmut Esters, SPD
 Carl Ewen, SPD
 Horst Eylmann, CDU

F 

 Sabine Fache, PDS (from 3 October 1990)
 Kurt Faltlhauser, CSU
 Annette Faße, SPD
 Jochen Feilcke, CDU
 Konrad Felber, FDP (from 3 October 1990)
 Olaf Feldmann, FDP
 Karl H Fell, CDU
 Hermann Fellner, CSU
 Walter Fiedler, CDU (from 3 October 1990)
 Michael Fischer, CDU (from 3 October 1990)
 Ursula Fischer, PDS (from 3 October 1990)
 Lothar Fischer, SPD
 Dirk Fischer, CDU
 Leni Fischer, CDU
 Dora Flinner, Die Grünen
 Sigrid Folz-Steinacker, FDP
 Klaus Francke, CDU
 Bernhard Friedmann, CDU (until 5 February 1990)
 Michael Friedrich, PDS (from 3 October 1990)
 Gerhard Friedrich, CSU
 Sieglinde Frieß, AL (from 21 February 1989)
 Christina Fritsch, SPD (from 3 October 1990)
 Ruth Fuchs, PDS (from 3 October 1990)
 Anke Fuchs, SPD
 Katrin Fuchs, SPD
 Hans-Joachim Fuchtel, CDU
 Honor Funk, CDU (from 20 May 1988 until 24 August 1989)
 Rainer Funke, FDP

G 

 Georg Gallus, FDP
 Monika Ganseforth, SPD
 Norbert Gansel, SPD
 Johannes Ganz, CDU
 Charlotte Garbe, Die Grünen
 Hans H. Gattermann, FDP
 Joachim Gauck, Bündnis 90 (from 3 October 1990 until 4 October 1990)
 Fritz Gautier, SPD
 Michaela Geiger, CSU
 Norbert Geis, CSU
 Hans Geisler, CDU (from 3 October 1990)
 Heiner Geißler, CDU
 Wolfgang von Geldern, CDU
 Hans-Dietrich Genscher, FDP
 Ludwig Gerstein, CDU
 Johannes Gerster, CDU
 Florian Gerster, SPD
 Konrad Gilges, SPD
 Michael Glos, CSU
 Peter Glotz, SPD
 Reinhard Göhner, CDU
 Eberhard Goldhahn, CDU (from 3 October 1990)
 Rose Götte, SPD
 Stefan Gottschall, DSU (from 3 October 1994)
 Martin Göttsching, CDU (from 3 October 1990)
 Eike Götz, CSU
 Günter Graf, SPD
 Gundolf Gries, CDU (from 3 October 1990)
 Ekkehard Gries, FDP
 Wolfgang Gröbl, CSU
 Achim Großmann, SPD
 Josef Grünbeck, FDP
 Horst Grunenberg, SPD
 Martin Grüner, FDP
 Joachim Grünewald, CDU
 Horst Günther, CDU
 Martin Gutzeit, SPD (from 3 October 1990)
 Gregor Gysi, PDS (from 3 October 1990)

H 

 Karl Hermann Haack, SPD
 Dieter Haack, SPD
 Ernst Haar, SPD
 Hans-Joachim Hacker, SPD (from 3 October 1990)
 Hansjörg Häfele, CDU
 Gerald Häfner, Die Grünen
 Hildegard Hamm-Brücher, FDP
 Gerlinde Hämmerle, SPD
 Klaus Harries, CDU
 Liesel Hartenstein, SPD
 Jürgen Haschke, DSU (from 3 October 1991)
 Gottfried Haschke, CDU (from 3 October 1990)
 Udo Haschke, CDU (from 3 October 1990)
 Klaus Hasenfratz, SPD
 Gerda Hasselfeldt, CSU (from 24 March  1987)
 Ingomar Hauchler, SPD
 Volker Hauff, SPD (until 14 June 1989)
 Rainer Haungs, CDU
 Otto Hauser, CDU
 Hansheinz Hauser, CDU
 Gerd Jürgen Häuser, SPD (from 2 January 1990)
 Helmut Haussmann, FDP
 Klaus-Jürgen Hedrich, CDU
 Gerhard Heimann, SPD
 Ulrich Heinrich, FDP
 Dieter Heistermann, SPD
 Renate Hellwig, CDU
 Herbert Helmrich, CDU
 Frank Heltzig, SPD (from 3 October 1989)
 Ottfried Hennig, CDU
 Karitas Hensel, Die Grünen
 Ralph Herberholz, SPD (from 1 September 1990)
 Adolf Herkenrath, CDU
 Uwe-Jens Heuer, PDS (from 3 October 1990)
 Günther Heyenn, SPD
 Reinhold Hiller, SPD
 Imma Hillerich, Die Grünen
 Stephan Hilsberg, SPD (from 3 October 1990)
 Wolfgang Hinrichs, CDU
 Ernst Hinsken, CSU
 Burkhard Hirsch, FDP
 Walter Hitschler, FDP (from 7 August 1987)
 Paul Hoffacker, CDU
 Peter Wilhelm Höffkes, CSU
 Ingeborg Hoffmann, CDU
 Uwe Holtz, SPD
 Joachim Holz, CDU (from 3 October 1990)
 Bertram Hönicke, CDU (from 3 October 1990)
 Stefan Höpfinger, CSU
 Hans-Günter Hoppe, FDP
 Erwin Horn, SPD
 Karl-Heinz Hornhues, CDU
 Siegfried Hornung, CDU (from 6 February 1990)
 Joachim Hörster, CDU
 Willi Hoss, Die Grünen
 Werner Hoyer, FDP
 Gunter Huonker, SPD
 Agnes Hürland-Büning, CDU
 Heinz Günther Hüsch, CDU
 Uwe Hüser, Die Grünen
 Hans Graf Huyn, CSU (from 2 August 1988)

I 
 Lothar Ibrügger, SPD
 Ulrich Irmer, FDP

J 

 Susanne Jaffke, CDU (from 3 October 1990)
 Claus Jäger, CDU (from 1 July 1988)
 Gerhard Jahn, SPD
 Friedrich-Adolf Jahn, CDU
 Günther Jansen, SPD (until 16 June 1988)
 Horst Jaunich, SPD
 Philipp Jenninger, CDU
 Uwe Jens, SPD
 Dionys Jobst, CSU
 Rainer Jork, CDU (from 3 October 1990)
 Volker Jung, SPD
 Michael Jung, CDU
 Wilhelm Jung, CDU
 Horst Jungmann, SPD

K 

 Bartholomäus Kalb, CSU
 Joachim Kalisch, CDU
 Manfred Kalz, SPD (from 3 October 1990)
 Karl-August Kamilli, SPD (from 3 October 1990)
 Dietmar Kansy, CDU
 Franz-Hermann Kappes, CDU
 Irmgard Karwatzki, CDU
 Susanne Kastner, SPD (from 22 May 1989)
 Ernst Kastning, SPD
 Sylvia-Yvonne Kaufmann, PDS (from 3 October 1990)
 Dietmar Keller, PDS (from 3 October 1990)
 Peter Keller, CSU (from 23 February 1990)
 Petra Kelly, Die Grünen
 Norbert Kertscher, PDS (from 3 October 1990)
 Ignaz Kiechle, CSU
 Günter Kiehm, SPD
 Klaus Kirschner, SPD
 Karl Kisslinger, SPD
 Peter Kittelmann, CDU
 Jürgen Kleditzsch, CDU (from 3 October 1990)
 Heinrich Klein, SPD (until 18 December 1989)
 Thomas Klein, PDS (from 3 October 1990)
 Hans Klein, CSU
 Detlef Kleinert, FDP
 Hubert Kleinert, Die Grünen
 Karl-Heinz Klejdzinski, SPD
 Gerry Kley, FDP (from 3 October 1990)
 Ulrich Klinkert, CDU (from 3 October 1990)
 Hans-Ulrich Klose, SPD
 Wilhelm Knabe, Die Grünen
 Dieter-Lebrecht Koch, CDU (from 3 October 1990)
 Helmut Kohl, CDU
 Hans-Ulrich Köhler, CDU (from 3 October 1990)
 Volkmar Köhler, CDU
 Roland Kohn, FDP
 Elmar Kolb, CDU
 Walter Kolbow, SPD
 Rolf Koltzsch, SPD
 Hans Koschnick, SPD
 Manfred Koslowski, CDU (from 3 October 1990)
 Thomas Kossendey, CDU
 Almut Kottwitz, Die Grünen (from 8 November 1989)
 Rudolf Kraus, CSU
 Günther Krause, CDU (from 3 October 1990)
 Wolfgang Krause, CDU (from 3 October 1990)
 Constanze Krehl, SPD (from 3 October 1990)
 Reinhold Kreile, CSU (from 11 July 1988 until 22 February 1990)
 Volkmar Kretkowski, SPD
 Matthias Kreuzeder, Die Grünen
 Franz Heinrich Krey, CDU
 Verena Krieger, Die Grünen (until 4 April 1989)
 Hermann Kroll-Schlüter, CDU
 Friedrich Kronenberg, CDU
 Paul Krüger, CDU (from 3 October 1990)
 Klaus Kübler, SPD (from 15 June 1989)
 Hinrich Kuessner, SPD (from 3 October 1990)
 Ursula Kugler, SPD (from 1 June 1990)
 Klaus-Dieter Kühbacher, SPD
 Eckart Kuhlwein, SPD
 Max Kunz, CSU

L 

 Karl-Hans Laermann, FDP
 Uwe Lambinus, SPD
 Otto Graf Lambsdorff, FDP
 Karl Lamers, CDU
 Norbert Lammert, CDU
 Sabine Landgraf, DSU (from 3 October 1993)
 Katharina Landgraf, CDU (from 3 October 1990)
 Manfred Langner, CDU
 Herbert Lattmann, CDU
 Paul Laufs, CDU
 Conrad-Michael Lehment, FDP (from 3 October 1990)
 Robert Leidinger, SPD
 Michael Leja, CDU (from 3 October 1990)
 Karl Heinz Lemmrich, CSU (until 28 July 1988)
 Klaus Lennartz, SPD
 Christian Lenzer, CDU
 Günther Leonhart, SPD
 Editha Limbach, CDU
 Walter Link, CDU
 Helmut Link, CDU
 Josef Linsmeier, CSU
 Eduard Lintner, CSU
 Helmut Lippelt, Die Grünen
 Klaus Lippold, CDU
 Wolfgang Lohmann, CDU (from 12 November 1990)
 Klaus Lohmann, SPD
 Peter Lorenz, CDU (until 6 December 1987)
 Julius Louven, CDU
 Ortwin Lowack, CSU
 Christine Lucyga, SPD (from 3 October 1990)
 Wolfgang Lüder, FDP
 Heinrich Lummer, CDU
 Egon Lutz, SPD
 Dagmar Luuk, SPD

M 

 Erich Maaß, CDU
 Theo Magin, CDU
 Dietrich Mahlo, CDU (from 9 December 1987)
 Lothar de Maizière, CDU (from 3 October 1990)
 Ursula Männle, CSU
 Erwin Marschewski, CDU
 Dörte Martini zum Berge, CDU (from 3 October 1990)
 Anke Martiny-Glotz, SPD (until 22 May 1989)
 Ingrid Matthäus-Maier, SPD
 Alfred Mechtersheimer, Die Grünen
 Heinz Menzel, SPD
 Franz-Josef Mertens, SPD
 Reinhard Meyer zu Bentrup, CDU
 Heinz-Werner Meyer, SPD
 Maria Michalk, CDU (from 3 October 1990)
 Meinolf Michels, CDU
 Karl Miltner, CDU (until 20 May 1988)
 Wolfgang Mischnick, FDP
 Hans-Jürgen Misselwitz, SPD (from 3 October 1990)
 Peter Mitzscherling, SPD (until 10 May 1989)
 Hans Modrow, PDS (from 3 October 1990)
 Jürgen Möllemann, FDP
 Franz Möller, CDU
 Luise Morgenstern, SPD (from 3 October 1990)
 Marion Morgenstern, PDS (from 3 October 1990)
 Michael Müller, SPD
 Albrecht Müller, SPD
 Rudolf Müller, SPD
 Hans-Werner Müller, CDU
 Alfons Müller, CDU
 Günther Müller, CSU
 Franz Müntefering, SPD

N 

 Werner Nagel, SPD
 Albert Nehm, SPD
 Engelbert Nelle, CDU
 Friedrich Neuhausen, FDP
 Christian Neuling, CDU
 Bernd Neumann, CDU
 Christa Nickels, Die Grünen
 Lorenz Niegel, CSU
 Edith Niehuis, SPD
 Rolf Niese, SPD
 Horst Niggemeier, SPD
 Johannes Nitsch, CDU (from 3 October 1990)
 Wilhelm Nöbel, SPD
 Claudia Nolte, CDU (from 3 October 1990)
 Günther Friedrich Nolting, FDP
 Joachim Hubertus Nowack, CDU (from 3 October 1990)

O 

 Doris Odendahl, SPD
 Günter Oesinghaus, SPD
 Jutta Oesterle-Schwerin, Die Grünen
 Rolf Olderog, CDU
 Ellen Olms, AL (until 20 February 1989)
 Jan Oostergetelo, SPD
 Manfred Opel, SPD (from 20 June 1988)
 Rainer Ortleb, FDP (from 3 October 1990)
 Klaus-Dieter Osswald, SPD (from 6 June 1988)
 Christine Ostrowski, PDS (from 3 October 1990)
 Eduard Oswald, CSU

P 

 Gisbert Paar, CDU (from 3 October 1990)
 Doris Pack, CDU (until 8 September 1989)
 Johann Paintner, FDP
 Peter Paterna, SPD
 Uwe Patzig, CDU (from 3 October 1990)
 Günter Pauli, SPD
 Willfried Penner, SPD
 Hans-Wilhelm Pesch, CDU
 Horst Peter, SPD
 Peter Petersen, CDU
 Gerhard O Pfeffermann, CDU
 Anton Pfeifer, CDU
 Angelika Pfeiffer, CDU (from 3 October 1990)
 Gero Pfennig, CDU
 Albert Pfuhl, SPD
 Eckhart Pick, SPD
 Winfried Pinger, CDU
 Matthias Platzeck, other (from 3 October 1990)
 Heinrich Pohlmeier, CDU
 Konrad Porzner, SPD (until 2 October 1990)
 Joachim Poß, SPD
 Rosemarie Priebus, CDU (from 3 October 1990)
 Albert Probst, CSU
 Rudolf Purps, SPD

R 

 Hermann Rappe, SPD
 Rolf Rau, CDU (from 3 October 1990)
 Klaus Rauber, CDU (from 3 October 1990)
 Peter Rauen, CDU
 Wilhelm Rawe, CDU
 Gerhard Reddemann, CDU
 Otto Regenspurger, CSU
 Stefanie Rehm, CDU (from 3 October 1990)
 Klaus Reichenbach, CDU (from 3 October 1990)
 Manfred Reimann, SPD
 Annemarie Renger, SPD
 Hans-Peter Repnik, CDU
 Otto Reschke, SPD
 Peter Reuschenbach, SPD
 Bernd Reuter, SPD
 Edelbert Richter, SPD (from 3 October 1990)
 Manfred Richter, FDP
 Erich Riedl, CSU
 Gerhard Riege, PDS (from 3 October 1990)
 Heinz Riesenhuber, CDU
 Hermann Rind, FDP
 Günter Rixe, SPD
 Ingrid Roitzsch, CDU
 Uwe Ronneburger, FDP
 Hannelore Rönsch, CDU
 Klaus Rose, CSU
 Norbert Roske, Die Grünen (from 22 June 1990)
 Kurt Rossmanith, CSU
 Gabriele Rost, CDU (from 26 September 1989 until 16 February 1990)
 Adolf Roth, CDU
 Wolfgang Roth, SPD
 Heinz Rother, CDU (from 3 October 1990)
 Rudolf Ruf, CDU
 Volker Rühe, CDU
 Wolfgang Rumpf, FDP (until 6 August 1987)
 Bärbel Rust, Die Grünen
 Jürgen Rüttgers, CDU

S 

 Halo Saibold, Die Grünen
 Helmut Sauer, CDU
 Roland Sauer, CDU
 Alfred Sauter, CSU (until 6 July 1988)
 Franz Sauter, CDU
 Helmut Schäfer, FDP
 Harald B Schäfer, SPD
 Dieter Schanz, SPD
 Eberhard Scharf, CDU (from 3 October 1990)
 Heribert Scharrenbroich, CDU
 Günther Schartz, CDU
 Ortrun Schätzle, CDU (from 25 August 1989)
 Wolfgang Schäuble, CDU
 Hermann Scheer, SPD
 Heinz Schemken, CDU
 Volker Schemmel, SPD (from 3 October 1990)
 Manfred Scherrer, SPD (until 31 August 1990)
 Gerhard Scheu, CSU
 Gertrud Schilling, Die Grünen
 Otto Schily, Die Grünen (until 7 November 1989)
 Günter Schluckebier, SPD
 Bernd Schmidbauer, CDU
 Trudi Schmidt, CDU (from 9 September 1989)
 Thomas Schmidt, DSU (from 3 October 1990)
 Frank Schmidt, CDU (from 3 October 1990)
 Christa Schmidt, CDU (from 3 October 1990)
 Marie-Luise Schmidt, Die Grünen (from 20 February 1989)
 Renate Schmidt, SPD
 Wilhelm Schmidt, SPD
 Manfred Schmidt, SPD
 Regula Schmidt-Bott, Die Grünen (until 18 February 1989)
 Joachim Schmiele, DSU (from 3 October 1995)
 Hans Peter Schmitz, CDU
 Michael von Schmude, CDU
 Jürgen Schmude, SPD
 Manfred Schneider, CDU (from 8 February 1990)
 Reiner Schneider, CDU (from 3 October 1990)
 Oscar Schneider, CSU
 Emil Schnell, SPD (from 3 October 1990)
 Rudolf Schöfberger, SPD
 Martina Schönebeck, PDS (from 3 October 1990)
 Waltraud Schoppe, Die Grünen (until 21 June 1990)
 Reinhard von Schorlemer, CDU
 Werner Schreiber, CDU
 Ottmar Schreiner, SPD
 Richard Schröder, SPD (from 3 October 1990)
 Conrad Schroeder, CDU
 Thomas Schröer, SPD
 Wolfgang Schulhoff, CDU
 Dieter Schulte, CDU
 Christian Friedrich Schultze, SPD (from 3 October 1990)
 Werner Schulz, Bündnis 90 (from 3 October 1990)
 Gerhard Schulze, CDU
 Fritz Schumann, PDS (from 3 October 1990)
 Michael Schumann, PDS (from 3 October 1990)
 Dietmar Schütz, SPD
 Clemens Schwalbe, CDU (from 3 October 1990)
 Rolf Schwanitz, SPD (from 3 October 1990)
 Heinz Schwarz, CDU
 Christian Schwarz-Schilling, CDU
 Hermann Schwörer, CDU
 Per-René Seeger, SPD (from 3 October 1990)
 Horst Seehofer, CSU
 Heinrich Seesing, CDU
 Inge Segall, FDP
 Bodo Seidenthal, SPD
 Ilja Seifert, PDS (from 3 October 1990)
 Ursula Seiler-Albring, FDP
 Rudolf Seiters, CDU
 Karl-Ernst Selke, CDU (from 3 October 1990)
 Peter Sellin, AL (until 20 February 1989)
 Lisa Seuster, SPD
 Horst Sielaff, SPD
 Wolfgang Sieler, SPD
 Heide Simonis, SPD (until 8 June 1988)
 Johannes Singer, SPD
 Sigrid Skarpelis-Sperk, SPD
 Hartmut Soell, SPD
 Hermann Otto Solms, FDP
 Cornelie Sonntag-Wolgast, SPD (from 14 June 1988)
 Wieland Sorge, SPD (from 3 October 1990)
 Dietrich Sperling, SPD
 Karl-Heinz Spilker, CSU
 Dieter Spöri, SPD (until 5 June 1988)
 Carl-Dieter Spranger, CSU
 Rudolf Sprung, CDU
 Erwin Stahl, SPD
 Anton Stark, CDU
 Lutz Stavenhagen, CDU
 Andreas Steiner, DSU (from 3 October 1992)
 Heinz-Alfred Steiner, SPD
 Waltraud Steinhauer, SPD
 Klaus Steinitz, PDS (from 3 October 1990)
 Volker Stephan, SPD (from 3 October 1990)
 Hans Stercken, CDU
 Ludwig Stiegler, SPD
 Dietrich Stobbe, SPD
 Ulrich Stockmann, SPD (from 3 October 1990)
 Roswitha Stolfa, PDS (from 3 October 1990)
 Gerhard Stoltenberg, CDU
 Günter Straßmeir, CDU
 Eckhard Stratmann, Die Grünen
 Franz Josef Strauß, CSU (until 19 March  1987)
 Hans-Gerd Strube, CDU
 Peter Struck, SPD
 Richard Stücklen, CSU
 Manfred Such, Die Grünen (from 4 April 1989)
 Egon Susset, CDU
 Rita Süssmuth, CDU

T 

 Ingeborg Tamm, CDU (from 3 October 1990)
 Margitta Terborg, SPD
 Maria Luise Teubner, Die Grünen
 Olaf Thees, CDU (from 3 October 1990)
 Wolfgang Thierse, SPD (from 3 October 1990)
 Dieter Thomae, FDP
 Frank Tiesler, DSU (from 3 October 1996)
 Günther Tietjen, SPD
 Ferdinand Tillmann, CDU
 Helga Timm, SPD
 Jürgen Timm, FDP
 Jürgen Todenhöfer, CDU
 Hans-Günther Toetemeyer, SPD
 Willibald Toscher, CDU (from 3 October 1990)
 Brigitte Traupe, SPD
 Erika Trenz, Die Grünen
 Hans-Jochen Tschiche, Bündnis 90 (from 3 October 1990)

U 
 Sabine Uecker, SPD (from 3 October 1990)
 Klaus-Dieter Uelhoff, CDU
 Gunnar Uldall, CDU
 Wolfgang Ullmann, Bündnis 90 (from 3 October 1990)
 Dietmar-Richard Unger, CDU (from 3 October 1990)
 Hermann Josef Unland, CDU
 Trude Unruh, other (independent from 13 September 1989)
 Hans-Eberhard Urbaniak, SPD

V 

 Jürgen Vahlberg, SPD
 Christa Vennegerts, Die Grünen
 Günter Verheugen, SPD
 Roswitha Verhülsdonk, CDU
 Friedrich Vogel, CDU
 Hans-Jochen Vogel, SPD
 German Meneses Vogl, AL (from 21 February 1989)
 Wolfgang Vogt, CDU
 Karsten Voigt, SPD
 Hans-Peter Voigt, CDU
 Bernd Voigtländer, SPD (from 3 October 1990)
 Antje Vollmer, Die Grünen
 Ludger Volmer, Die Grünen
 Ruprecht Vondran, CDU
 Josef Vosen, SPD
 Friedrich Voss, CSU

W 

 Horst Waffenschmidt, CDU
 Heinz Wagner, CDU (from 3 October 1990)
 Theodor Waigel, CSU
 Alois Graf von Waldburg-Zeil, CDU
 Walter Wallmann, CDU (until 29 April 1987)
 Ernst Waltemathe, SPD
 Hansjoachim Walther, DSU (from 3 October 1987)
 Rudi Walther, SPD
 Ingrid Walz, FDP (from 6 January 1989)
 Jürgen Warnke, CSU
 Alexander Warrikoff, CDU
 Ludolf von Wartenberg, CDU
 Gerd Wartenberg, SPD
 Solveig Wegener, PDS (from 3 October 1990)
 Konstanze Wegner, SPD (from 31 August 1988)
 Wolfgang Weiermann, SPD
 Barbara Weiler, SPD
 Karl Weinhofer, SPD (from 3 October 1990)
 Dieter Weirich, CDU (from 29 April 1987 until 6 December 1989)
 Reinhard Weis, SPD (from 3 October 1990)
 Michael Weiss, Die Grünen
 Werner Weiß, CDU (until 6 February 1990)
 Gunter Weißgerber, SPD (from 3 October 1990)
 Gert Weisskirchen, SPD
 Wolfgang Weng, FDP
 Herbert Werner, CDU
 Axel Wernitz, SPD
 Heinz Westphal, SPD
 Kersten Wetzel, CDU (from 3 October 1990)
 Dietrich Wetzel, Die Grünen
 Gudrun Weyel, SPD
 Bertram Wieczorek, CDU (from 3 October 1990)
 Helmut Wieczorek, SPD
 Norbert Wieczorek, SPD
 Heidemarie Wieczorek-Zeul, SPD
 Dieter Wiefelspütz, SPD
 Eugen von der Wiesche, SPD
 Waltrud Will-Feld, CDU
 Dorothee Wilms, CDU
 Heike Wilms-Kegel, Die Grünen
 Bernd Wilz, CDU
 Hermann Wimmer, SPD
 Willy Wimmer, CDU
 Heinrich Windelen, CDU
 Hans-Jürgen Wischnewski, SPD
 Roswitha Wisniewski, CDU
 Matthias Wissmann, CDU
 Hans de With, SPD
 Berthold Wittich, SPD
 Fritz Wittmann, CSU
 Torsten Wolfgramm, FDP
 Vera Wollenberger, Grüne DDR (from 5 October 1990)
 Lieselotte Wollny, Die Grünen
 Michael Wonneberger, CDU (from 3 October 1990)
 Manfred Wörner, CDU (until 30 June 1988)
 Dieter Wöstenberg, FDP (from 3 October 1990)
 Otto Wulff, CDU
 Thomas Wüppesahl, other (independent from 26 January 1988)
 Uta Würfel, FDP
 Peter Würtz, SPD
 Peter Kurt Würzbach, CDU

Z 
 Fred Zander, SPD
 Werner Zeitler, SPD
 Wolfgang Zeitlmann, CSU
 Benno Zierer, CSU
 Hans Zimmermann, CDU (from 3 October 1990)
 Friedrich Zimmermann, CSU
 Otto Zink, CDU
 Klaus-Otto Zirkler, FDP (from 3 October 1990)
 Georg Zschornack, FDP (from 3 October 1990)
 Peter Zumkley, SPD
 Ruth Zutt, SPD (until 29 June 1987)
 Constantin Heereman von Zuydtwyck, CDU
 Werner Zywietz, FDP

See also 

 Politics of Germany
 List of Bundestag Members

11